Carmine Rocco (12 April 1912 – 12 May 1982) was an Italian prelate of the Catholic Church who devoted his entire career to the diplomatic service of the Holy See. He became an archbishop in 1961 and served as an Apostolic Nuncio from 1959 until his death.

Biography
Carmine Rocco was born on 12 April 1912 in Camigliano, Italy, the last of seven children. He entered the local seminary at the age of twelve and studied at the Jesuit's Campano di Posillipo seminary from 1930 to 1936. He was ordained a priest of the Diocese of Teano-Calvi on 26 July 1936.

To prepare for a diplomatic career he entered the Pontifical Ecclesiastical Academy in 1937. From 1939 to 1946 he was assigned to the nunciature in France, which was headed by Angelo Roncalli, the future Pope John XXIII, as of 24 December 1944. He worked in Argentina from 1946 to 1949, in Rome at the Secretariat of State from 1953 to 1956, and in Brazil from 1956 to 1959.

On 19 January 1959, Pope John XXIII, who knew Rocco from their time together in France at the end of World War II, named him Apostolic Nuncio to Bolivia. On 5 October 1961, Pope John appointed him titular archbishop of Iustinianopolis in Galatia. He received his episcopal consecration on 12 November 1961 in Rome's San Carlo al Corso from Cardinal Amleto Cicognani.

On 16 September 1967, Pope Paul VI named him Apostolic Nuncio to the Philippines. 

On 23 May 1973, Pope Paul VI appointed him Apostolic Nuncio to Brazil. 

He returned to Rome for medical treatment and died at the Agostino Gemelli University Policlinic on 12 May 1982.

Notes

References

External links 
Catholic Hierarchy: Archbishop Carmine Rocco 

1912 births
1982 deaths
People from the Province of Caserta
Pontifical Ecclesiastical Academy alumni
Apostolic Nuncios to Brazil
Apostolic Nuncios to the Philippines
Apostolic Nuncios to Bolivia